Anthony Banua-Simon is an American documentary film director and editor.

Career
Anthony attended Evergreen State College and is currently a member of the Spectacle Theater. He directed a short documentary Third Shift, which won best documentary short at the Brooklyn Film Festival in 2014. In 2020, he directed his debut feature documentary Cane Fire, which premiered at the Hot Docs Canadian International Documentary Festival.

In 2021, Anthony was named in Filmmakers "25 New Faces of Independent Film" and listed in DOC NYC's "40 Under 40" list for 2022.

Selected filmography

Awards and nominations

References

External links
 
 

Living people

Year of birth missing (living people)
American documentary film directors
American documentary filmmakers